The following units of the German First Army and British Expeditionary Force fought in the Battle of Mons in World War I.

German First Army

First Army, commanded by Generaloberst Alexander von Kluck

II Army Corps
30th Aviation Battalion
15th Foot Artillery Regiment (heavy)

3rd Infantry Division

3rd Artillery Brigade

3rd Horse Grenadiers

5th Infantry Brigade
2nd Grenadier Regiment
9th Grenadier Regiment

6th Infantry Brigade
34th Fusilier Regiment
42nd Infantry Regiment

4th Infantry Division

4th Artillery Brigade

12th Dragoons

7th Infantry Brigade
14th Infantry Regiment
149th Infantry Regiment

8th Infantry Brigade
 49th Infantry Regiment
140th Infantry Regiment

III Army Corps
7th Aviation Battalion
2nd Guard Foot Artillery (heavy)
3rd Hussars

5th Infantry Division

5th Artillery Brigade

9th Infantry Brigade
8th Leib Grenadier Regiment
48th Infantry Regiment

10th Infantry Brigade
12th Grenadier Regiment
52nd Infantry Regiment

6th Infantry Division

6th Artillery Brigade

11th Infantry Brigade
20th Infantry Regiment
35th Fusilier Regiment

12th Infantry Brigade
24th Infantry Regiment
64th Infantry Regiment
3rd Jaeger Battalion

IV Army Corps
9th Aviation Battalion
4th Foot Artillery Regiment (heavy)
10th Hussars

7th Infantry Division

7th Artillery Brigade

13th Infantry Brigade
26th Infantry Regiment
66th Infantry Regiment

14th Infantry Brigade
27th Infantry Regiment
165th Infantry Regiment

8th Infantry Division

8th Artillery Brigade

15th Infantry Brigade
36th Fusilier Regiment
93rd Infantry Regiment

16th Infantry Brigade
72nd Infantry Regiment
153rd Infantry Regiment
4th Jaeger Battalion

IX Army Corps
9th Aviation Battalion
20th Foot Artillery Regiment (heavy)
16th Dragoons

17th Infantry Division

17th Artillery Brigade

33rd Infantry Brigade
75th Infantry Regiment
76th Infantry Regiment

34th Infantry Brigade
89th Grenadier Regiment
90th Fusilier Regiment
9th Jaeger Battalion

18th Infantry Division

18th Artillery Brigade

35th Infantry Brigade
84th Infantry Regiment
86th Fusilier Regiment

36th Infantry Brigade
31st Infantry Regiment
85th Infantry Regiment

III Reserve Corps

5th Reserve Division

2nd Reserve Dragoon Regiment (3 squadrons)
6th Reserve Field Artillery Regiment (6 batteries)

9th Reserve Infantry Brigade
8th Reserve Infantry Regiment
48th Reserve Infantry Regiment

10th Reserve Infantry Brigade
12th Reserve Infantry Regiment
52nd Reserve Infantry Regiment

6th Reserve Division

3rd Reserve Uhlan Regiment (3 squadrons)
6th Reserve Field Artillery Regiment (6 batteries)

11th Reserve Infantry Brigade
20th Reserve Infantry Regiment
24th Reserve Infantry Regiment

12th Reserve Infantry Brigade
26th Reserve Infantry Regiment
35th Reserve Infantry Regiment

IV Reserve Corps

7th Reserve Division

1st Reserve Schwere Reiter Regiment (3 squadrons)
7th Field Artillery Regiment (6 batteries)

13th Reserve Brigade
27th Reserve Infantry Regiment
36th Reserve Infantry Regiment

14th Reserve Brigade
66th Reserve Infantry Regiment
72nd Reserve Infantry Regiment
4th Reserve Jaeger Battalion

22nd Reserve Division

1st Reserve Jäger zu Pferde Regiment (3 squadrons)
22nd Reserve Field Artillery Regiment (6 batteries)

43rd Reserve Infantry Brigade
71st Reserve Infantry Regiment
94th Reserve Infantry Regiment
11th Reserve Jaeger Battalion

44th Reserve Infantry Brigade
32nd Reserve Infantry Regiment
82nd Reserve Infantry Regiment

10th Mixed Landwehr Brigade
12th Landwehr Infantry Regiment
52nd Landwehr Infantry Regiment

11th Mixed Landwehr Brigade
20th Landwehr Infantry Regiment
35th Landwehr Infantry Regiment

27th Landwehr Brigade
53rd Landwehr Infantry Regiment
55th Landwehr Infantry Regiment

Composite Landwehr Cavalry Unit (3 squadrons)
Composite Lansturm Artillery Unit (2 batteries)

Army Troops
12th Aviation Battalion

British Expeditionary Force

British Expeditionary Force, commanded by Field Marshal Sir John French

Army Troops
A and C Squadrons North Irish Horse
B Squadron South Irish Horse
1st Bn Queens Own Cameron Highlanders

Line of communications defence troops
1st Devonshire
19th Infantry Brigade (formed 22 August 1914)
2nd Bn Royal Welsh Fusiliers
1st Bn Cameronians (Scottish Rifles)
1st Bn Duke of Cambridge’s Own
2nd Argyll and Sutherland Highlanders

I Corps
I Corps, commanded by Lieutenant-General Douglas Haig

1st Division (Lomax)

1st Guards Brigade
1st Coldstream Guards
1st Scots Guards
1st Black Watch
2nd Royal Munster Fusiliers

2nd Infantry Brigade
2nd Royal Sussex Regiment
1st Loyal North Lancashire Regiment
1st Northamptonshire Regiment
2nd Kings Royal Rifle Corps

3rd Infantry Brigade
1st Royal West Surrey Regiment
1st South Wales Borderers
1st Gloucestershire Regiment
2nd Welsh

XXV Brigade, Royal Field Artillery
113th Battery
114th Battery
115th Battery

XXVI Brigade, Royal Field Artillery
116th Battery
117th Battery
118th Battery

XXXIX Brigade, Royal Field Artillery
46th Battery
51st Battery
54th Battery

XLIII (Howitzer) Brigade, Royal Field Artillery
30th (H) Battery
40th (H) Battery
57th (H) Battery

26th Heavy Battery Royal Garrison Artillery

2nd Division (Monro)

4th Guards Brigade
2nd Grenadier Guards
2nd Coldstream Guards
3rd Coldstream Guards
1st Irish Guards

5th Infantry Brigade
2nd Worcestershire
2nd Oxfordshire and Buckinghamshire Light Infantry
2nd Highland Light Infantry
2nd Connaught Rangers

6th Infantry Brigade
1st Liverpool Regiment
2nd South Staffordshire
1st Royal Berkshire
1st Kings Royal Rifle Corps

XXXIV Brigade, Royal Field Artillery
22nd Battery
50th Battery
70th Battery

XXXVI Brigade, Royal Field Artillery
15th Battery
48th Battery
71st Battery

XLI Brigade, Royal Field Artillery
9th Battery
16th Battery
17th Battery

XLIV (Howitzer) Brigade, Royal Field Artillery
47th (H) Battery
56th (H) Battery
60th (H) Battery

35th Heavy Battery Royal Garrison Artillery

II Corps
II Corps, commanded by General Horace Smith-Dorrien

3rd Division (Hamilton)

7th Infantry Brigade
3rd Bn Worcestershire Regiment
2nd Bn South Lancashire Regiment
1st Bn Duke of Edinburgh's (Wiltshire Regiment)
2nd Bn Royal Irish Rifles

8th Infantry Brigade
2nd Royal Scots
2nd Royal Irish Regiment
4th Middlesex Regiment 
1st Gordon Highlanders

9th Infantry Brigade
1st Northumberland Fusiliers
4th Royal Fusiliers
1st Lincolnshire
1st Royal Scots Fusiliers

XXIII Brigade, Royal Field Artillery
107th Battery
108th Battery
109th Battery

XL Brigade, Royal Field Artillery
6th Battery
23rd Battery
49th Battery

XLII Brigade, Royal Field Artillery
29th Battery
41st Battery
45th Battery

XXX (Howitzer) Brigade , Royal Field Artillery
128th (H) Battery
129th (H) Battery
130th (H) Battery

48th Heavy Battery Royal Garrison Artillery

5th Division (Fergusson)

13th Infantry Brigade
2nd Bn Kings Own Scottish Borderers
2nd Bn Duke of Wellington’s
1st Bn Royal West Kent
2nd Bn Yorkshire Light Infantry

14th Infantry Brigade
2nd Bn Suffolk Regiment
1st Bn East Surrey Regiment
1st Bn Duke of Cornwall's Light Infantry
2nd Bn Manchester Regiment

15th Infantry Brigade
1st Bn Norfolk Regiment
1st Bn Bedfordshire Regiment
1st Bn Cheshire Regiment
1st Bn Dorsetshire Regiment

XV Brigade, Royal Field Artillery
11th Battery
52nd Battery
80th Battery

XXVII Brigade, Royal Field Artillery
119th Battery
120th Battery
121st Battery

XXVIII Brigade, Royal Field Artillery
122nd Battery
123rd Battery
124th Battery

VIII (Howitzer) Brigade, Royal Field Artillery
37th (H) Battery
61st (H) Battery
65th (H) Battery

108th Heavy Battery Royal Garrison Artillery

Cavalry Division
Cavalry Division, commanded by Major-General Edmund Allenby

1st Cavalry Brigade
2nd Dragoon Guards
5th Dragoon Guards
11th Hussars

2nd Cavalry Brigade
4th Dragoon Guards
9th Lancers
18th Hussars

3rd Cavalry Brigade
4th (Queen's Own) Hussars
5th (Royal Irish) Lancers
16th (The Queen's) Lancers

4th Cavalry Brigade
6th Dragoon Guards (Carabineers)
3rd (The King's Own) Hussars
Household Cavalry Composite Regiment

5th  Cavalry Brigade
2nd Dragoons (Royal Scots Greys)
12th (The Prince of Wales's) Royal Regiment of Lancers
20th Hussars

Artillery
III Brigade, Royal Horse Artillery
D Battery, RHA
E Battery, RHA
VII Brigade, Royal Horse Artillery
I Battery, RHA
L Battery, RHA

Royal Flying Corps in the Field 
Royal Flying Corps, commanded by Brigadier-General David Henderson

2nd Aeroplane Squadron (Charles Burke)
3rd Aeroplane Squadron (John Salmond)
4th Aeroplane Squadron (Raleigh)
5th Aeroplane Squadron (John Frederick Andrews Higgins)
1st Aircraft Park (Carden)

Sources

Bell, Ron. “The Old Contemptibles.”  Strategy & Tactics, Number 228 (May/June 2005).
Terraine, John.  Mons, The Retreat to Victory.  Wordsworth. pp. 200–202

Mons